The Workers Compensation Board of Manitoba (WCB) is an agency of the Government of Manitoba that provides a system for workplace injury and disability insurance for workers and employers of Manitoba, paid for by employers.

Established in 1917 in accordance with The Workers Compensation Act, which was passed the previous year, WCB's creation was the result of a compromise: injured workers gave up the right to sue employers in exchange for no-fault insurance in the case of work-related injuries or illness, while employers agreed to pay for the system providing they would be protected from lawsuits. One of the problems that workers' compensation was created to solve, namely, the problem of employers becoming insolvent as a result of high damage awards. The system of collective liability was created to prevent that, and thus to ensure security of compensation to the workers. Individual immunity is the necessary corollary to collective liability.

WCB is run by a board of directors that consists of 10 members appointed by the Manitoba government from nominations submitted by labour, employers and the public. The Chief Executive Officer (CEO) is a non-voting member of the Board of Directors. , the current Chairperson of the Board of Directors is Michael D. Werier, and the current President and CEO is Richard Deacon. As of 2019, the Workers Compensation Board of Manitoba has reported to Manitoba's Minister of Finance.

WCB's organizational ombudsman is the Fair Practices Office. SAFE Work Manitoba, a division of the Workers Compensation Board, is a public agency focused on the prevention of workplace injury and illness.

The Workers Compensation Act 
The Workers Compensation Act was passed in 1916, establishing the Workers Compensation Board the following year.

Assessments under the act are levied upon employers and gathered into a common fund out of which benefits are paid to workers who are injured as a result of their employment. Administration and adjudication are carried out by the Workers Compensation Board of Manitoba.

Minister responsible for The Workers Compensation Act 
Since 1981, the Executive Council of Manitoba has included a Minister responsible for The Workers Compensation Act; however the specific ministerial designation has changed several times over the years, and the current position is not a full cabinet portfolio but rather is held by a minister with other cabinet responsibilities. For instance, most ministers responsible for the Workers Compensation Act have also been Ministers of Labour, though not necessarily.

As of 2019, the Workers Compensation Board of Manitoba has reported to Manitoba's Minister of Finance.

The position was first held by Jay Cowan, who, in addition to overseeing other portfolios in cabinet, was designated as Minister responsible for the Workers Compensation Act and Minister responsible for The Workplace Safety and Health Act. In 1983, both positions were incorporated into the new cabinet portfolio of Workplace Safety and Health, the first minister for which was Gerard Lecuyer, who was also Minister of Environment. In 1991, the Workplace Safety and Health portfolio was eliminated.

List of Ministers

References

External links
Workers Compensation Board of Manitoba

Manitoba government departments and agencies
Workers' compensation